"Love Me Now" is a song by Norwegian DJ and producer Kygo featuring German singer-songwriter Zoe Wees. It was released on 13 August 2021 through RCA Records, as the 2nd single from Kygo's 4th album Thrill of the Chase.

Composition
Matthew Meadow of Youredm commented Kygo regress to "characteristic piano plucks and beautiful melodies", then mentioned it become "a little obsolete for fans who seek innovation of producer".

Critical reception
Niko Sani of edm.com praised the track: "features an immaculate summertime vibe representative of Kygo's signature sound." "intoxicating, feel-good summer jam and perfect ballad to finished the summer".

Music video
It has two videos for the song. The animated video was released on August 13, 2021. The official video was released on September 21, 2021, which stars Brittany O'Grady as Kygo's love interest. It was filmed on the Exumas in the Bahamas.

Credits and personnel
Credits adapted from Tidal.

 Kygo – producer, composer, lyricist, associated performer
 Zoe Wees – composer, lyricist, associated performer, background vocal, lead vocalist
 Patrick Pyke Salmy – composer, lyricist, recording engineer, vocal engineer
 Ricardo Muñoz – composer, lyricist, recording engineer, vocal engineer
 Hight – composer, lyricist
 Bryce Bordone – assistant engineer
 John Hanes – engineer
 Randy Merrill – mastering engineer
 Serban Ghenea – mixing engineer

Charts

Weekly charts

Year-end charts

Release history

References

2021 songs
2021 singles
Kygo songs
Songs written by Kygo
Song recordings produced by Kygo
RCA Records singles